Philibert Borie (1759–1832) was a French physician and Mayor of Paris for six days in July 1792.

1759 births
1832 deaths
18th-century French physicians
Mayors of Paris